Bangui M'Poko International Airport  is an international airport located  northwest of Bangui, capital of the Central African Republic.

In 2004, the airport served 53,862 passengers. In 2012, the airport had an average attendance of about 120,000 passengers, despite a maximum capacity of 10,000 passengers.

The airport was an unofficial refugee camp for some 60,000 refugees as of May 2014. In 2017, the airport was functioning under the supervision of the UN aviation officials.

Airlines and destinations

Statistics

See also 
 List of airports in the Central African Republic
 List of the busiest airports in Africa
 Transport in the Central African Republic

Footnotes

External links 
 

Airports in the Central African Republic
Buildings and structures in Bangui